MS Theofilos was a passenger/vehicle ferry built at the Nobiskrug shipyard in Rendsburg, Germany in 1975.

History 
MS Theofilos is a passenger/vehicle ferry that was built at Nobiskrug in Rendsburg for the TT-line (Germany) as the Nils Holgersson (3) for the Travemünde - Trelleborg route in 1975 along with her sister Peter Pan (2). In 1985 it was purchased and renamed Abel Tasman by TT-line (Tasmania) and after the Australian National Line (ANL) announced they would be pulling out of the Bass Strait run, so the Australian Federal Government gave the Tasmanian Government the capital required to buy a suitable ferry, in compensation for placing the environmentally-sensitive Gordon River off-limits to Hydro Tasmania power generation schemes. This ship turned out to be the Nils Holgersson (3) from the TT-line (Germany), which also came with an option to buy her sister ship Peter Pan (2) one year later (which never came to pass).

The ship was named after Abel Tasman, the first known European to reach the islands of Van Diemen's Land (now Tasmania). She first went back to her builder's yard for a refit, and for a large box-like structure to be added to the stern of the ship for the crew, because the Australian maritime union rules did not allow the crew to be under the car deck, which is where the crew cabins were. She left Rendsburg on 22 April 1985, but two days later she was stopped by an industrial dispute with the stewards. She first went to Brunsbuttel, but had to continue through the Kiel Canal, and into Kiel where she docked. The Tasmanian Government sent police to West Germany to end the dispute and get the ship underway, but on arrival the police were powerless in West Germany. So the Tasmanian Government had to change laws to empower them to resolve the problem, and she resumed her trip and left Kiel on 18 May 1985.

She then sailed to Australia, going straight to Devonport and not via Queensland and New South Wales as had been planned. She started on the Devonport–Melbourne route on 1 June 1985 from Melbourne. Her former Captain Rudolf Schonfeldt, sailed with the ship to Australia from Germany to advise the crew, unfamiliar with the new ship.

In 1993, she was laid up following the arrival of the much larger Spirit of Tasmania. In 1994, she was sold to Ventouris Ferries and renamed the Pollux. In 1995 she was again sold, this time to the Maritime Company of Lesvos and operated by Nel Lines, renamed Theofilos for the Piraeus–Chios–Mytilini route with calls sometimes in Thessaloniki and Limnos.

On 28 June 2008, Theofilos ran aground on a reef of rocks of the island of Oinousses about 10 nm from the island of Chios. She suffered serious damage to her port side hull, a 15–20 metres slash causing flooding of a water tight compartment, she subsequently developed a 2.5 degree list. The ship was repaired, with an estimated cost to Nel Lines underwriter, The West of England Shipowners of €5 million. Once the repairs were completed, she returned to normal service on 16 May 2009.

Since January 2018 Theofilos has been laid up at Elefsina Greece (Near Athens) following her owners declaring bankruptcy.
Since January 2020 she is under the flag of Togo. The ship was laid-up in terrible condition since 2020 in Perama, Greece and after two years of laid-up the ship sold for scrap in Aliaga, Turkey under the name Ilos in 2022.

Sister ship 
In 1986 the M/S Peter Pan (2) was renamed Robin Hood to free the name for the larger Peter Pan (3) (later Spirit of Tasmania). In 1987, she was sold to Minoan Lines and renamed Fedra. In 2004 she was transferred over to Hellas Ferries, then sold to Sea Hawk Marine, operated by Comanav. Later that year she was renamed Guido for a short time. She was then bought by Messrs Funtots, S.A. (El Salam Maritime) and renamed Ouzoud. She then operated under Comanav for six years on the 48-hour route from Genoa (Italy) – Tangier (Morocco). In January 2010, it was reported that Ouzoud has been sold to India for demolition.

References

External links
 Ships of Bass Strait
 TT-Line-Tasmania Website, Photos
 Photos of Tasmanian ferries

Ships built in Rendsburg
1974 ships